Kispesti Textil Sport Egyesület was a Hungarian football club from the town of Rákospalota, Budapest, Hungary.

History
Kispesti Textil Sport Egyesület debuted in the 1948–49 season of the Hungarian League and finished ninth.

Name Changes 
1929–1939: Kispesti Textilgyár 
1939: merger with Kőbányai FC 
1940–?: KISTEXT FC
?-1951: KISTEXT SE
1951–1956: Vörös Lobogó KISTEXT SK
1957–: KISTEXT SE

References

External links
 Profile

Football clubs in Hungary
1909 establishments in Hungary